
Basiliek is a restaurant in Harderwijk in the Netherlands. It is a fine dining restaurant that is awarded one Michelin star in the period 2007–present.

GaultMillau awarded the restaurant 16 out of 20 points. 

Head chef of Basiliek is Rik Jansma. 

Basiliek was founded in 2006, after Rik Jansma and Andrea van Zoomeren bought the closed down Michelin starred restaurant Olivio. Jansma had worked as sous chef in Olivio, prior to the closure.

See also
List of Michelin starred restaurants in the Netherlands

References 

Restaurants in the Netherlands
Michelin Guide starred restaurants in the Netherlands
Restaurants in Gelderland
Harderwijk